Edson Argenis Tortolero Román (born 27 August 1971) is a former Venezuelan football midfielder who made a total number of 39 appearances for the Venezuela national team between 1993 and 2006.

Club career
He started his professional career at Asociación Civil Minervén Fútbol Club.

References

External links

1971 births
Living people
Association football midfielders
Venezuelan footballers
Venezuela international footballers
1995 Copa América players
1999 Copa América players
Minervén S.C. players
Estudiantes de Mérida players
Deportivo Táchira F.C. players
Querétaro F.C. footballers
Carabobo F.C. players
Trujillanos FC players
Venezuelan expatriate footballers
Expatriate footballers in Mexico
Venezuelan expatriate sportspeople in Mexico
21st-century Venezuelan people
Llaneros Escuela de Fútbol managers